Quadruple helix may refer to:
 G-quadruplex secondary structures formed in nucleic acids.
 Quadruple helix model of innovation economics.